The Palazzo Orlandini del Beccuto, also known as Palazzo Gondi di Francia is a palace located with entrance on Via de' Pecori #6-8 in central Florence, region of Tuscany Italy.

The palace was a reconstruction on the site of one of the homes of the Gondi family. The present palace was designed in 1679 by Antonio Ferri and the courtyard was designed by Ignazio Del Rosso.

References

External links

Palaces in Florence
Montepaschi Group